The Society of Twentieth Century Wargamers (SOTCW) is an international body established in 1989 to promote all aspects of wargaming 20th century periods. Membership of the Society is on a subscription basis, with society members receiving copies of society magazine The Journal.

Activities 

Until 2019, the society produced a journal, featuring reviews, articles, scenarios, rules, letters, advertisements, traders' comments and offers. Many traders offer discounts to society members. In 2014, the society started offering PDF-only subscriptions on Wargame Vault, to complement the existing paper Journal. In 2019, the Journal was discontinued, content being posted to the website. Users may subscribe to get email notifications of new articles.

The society also operates a web forum.

In 2014, the society partnered with Shilka Publishing to publish a compendium of World War I-related articles. All profits from this compendium are donated to The Royal British Legion.

External links 

 Society of Twentieth Century Wargamers (SOTCW)
 SOTCW Forum
 

Fan clubs
Wargaming associations